Charles Ferguson Smith (April 24, 1807 – April 25, 1862) was a career United States Army officer who served in the Mexican–American War and as a Union General in the American Civil War.

Early life and career
Charles Ferguson Smith was born in Philadelphia, Pennsylvania, the son of Samuel Blair Smith, an army surgeon and a grandson of the celebrated Presbyterian minister Rev. John Blair Smith. He graduated from the United States Military Academy in 1825, and was commissioned a second lieutenant in the 2nd U.S. Artillery. As he rose slowly through the ranks of the peacetime army, he returned to West Point as an instructor and was appointed Commandant of Cadets as a first lieutenant, serving in that position from 1838 to 1843.

As an artillery battalion commander he distinguished himself in the Mexican–American War, serving under both Zachary Taylor and Winfield Scott, at Palo Alto, Resaca de la Palma, Monterrey, and Churubusco. He received brevet promotions from major through colonel for his service in these battles and ended the war as a lieutenant colonel in the Regular Army. In Mexico City, he was in charge of the police guard from the end of the war until 1848. During this time he became an original member of the Aztec Club of 1847.

He commanded the Red River Expedition (1856) into the future State of Minnesota in 1856–57, and served under Albert Sidney Johnston in Utah (1857–60), commanding the Department of Utah himself from 1860 to 1861, and the Department of Washington (at Fort Washington, Maryland) very briefly at the start of the Civil War.

Civil War
After the outbreak of the war and through the summer of 1861, Smith served on recruiting duty as commander of Fort Columbus, New York. He was commissioned a brigadier general of volunteers (August 31, 1861), and as colonel in the Regular Army, commanding the 3rd U.S. Infantry regiment, as of September 9. He was soon transferred to the Western Theater to command the District of Western Kentucky. He then became a division commander in the Department of the Missouri under Brigadier General Ulysses S. Grant, who had been one of his pupils at West Point. This potentially awkward situation was eased by Smith's loyalty to his young chief.

The old soldier led his division of raw volunteers with success at the Battle of Fort Donelson in February 1862. During the attack on the Confederate right flank, which he led personally, he saw some of his men waver. He yelled to them, "Damn you gentlemen, I see skulkers, I'll have none here. Come on, you volunteers, come on. You volunteered to be killed for love of country, and now you can be. You are only damned volunteers. I'm only a soldier, and don't want to be killed, but you came to be killed and now you can be."

Smith's experience, dignity, and unselfish character made him Grant's mainstay in the early days of the war. When theater commander Major General Henry Halleck became distrustful and perhaps envious of Grant, he briefly relieved him of field command of the Army's expedition up the Tennessee River toward Corinth, Mississippi and gave that responsibility to Smith. However, Halleck soon restored Grant to field command (intervention by President Abraham Lincoln may have been a factor). Grant's restoration was fortunate because by the time Grant reached Savannah, Tennessee, Smith had already met with an accident while jumping into a rowboat that seriously injured his leg, forcing him out of field duty. His senior brigadier, W.H.L. Wallace, led his division (and was fatally wounded) at the Battle of Shiloh.

Death
Smith died of an infection following his foot injury and chronic dysentery at Savannah, Tennessee, and was buried in Laurel Hill Cemetery in Philadelphia.

The early close of his career in high command deprived the Union army of one of its best leaders, and his absence was nowhere more felt than on the battlefield of Shiloh, where the Federals paid heavily for the inexperience of their generals. A month before his death, he had been made major general of volunteers.

Three forts were named in his honor. The first Fort C. F. Smith was part of the perimeter defenses of Washington, D.C. during the American Civil War. A second Fort C. F. Smith was located at the Bighorn River crossing of the Bozeman Trail in the Montana Territory during Red Cloud's War. The third was located in Bowling Green, Kentucky, and was constructed under the supervision of Union Colonel and future U.S. President Benjamin Harrison.

Dates of rank
Cadet, United States Military Academy - 1 July 1820
2nd Lieutenant, 2nd Artillery - 1 July 1825
1st Lieutenant, 2nd Artillery - 30 May 1862
Captain, 2nd Artillery - 7 July 1838
Brevet Major - 9 May 1846
Brevet Lieutenant Colonel - 23 September 1846
Brevet Colonel - 20 August 1847
Major, 1st Artillery - 25 November 1854
Lieutenant Colonel, 10th Infantry - 3 March 1855
Colonel, 3rd Infantry - 9 September 1861
Brigadier General, Volunteers - 31 August 1861
Major General, Volunteers - 21 March 1862
Died - 25 April 1862

See also

List of American Civil War generals (Union)

Notes

References
 
 .
 
 

Attribution

Further reading

External links
Minnesota Historical Society account of the Red River expedition
 Military biography of Smith from the Cullum biographies

1807 births
1862 deaths
Military personnel from Philadelphia
United States Military Academy alumni
American military personnel of the Mexican–American War
Members of the Aztec Club of 1847
Union Army generals
People of Pennsylvania in the American Civil War
Commandants of the Corps of Cadets of the United States Military Academy
Burials at Laurel Hill Cemetery (Philadelphia)
Deaths from dysentery